Symplocos tinctoria (the common sweetleaf, horse-sugar, or yellowwood) is a deciduous or evergreen shrub or tree. It is recognized by pith of twigs chambered; by foliage not notably aromatic when bruised, leaves finely hairy beneath. Shrubs or trees to 17 m tall by 36 cm diameter at breast height. The largest first-year twigs are under 3 mm across, terminal buds with acute tip, scales ciliate. Leaves are 7–15 cm long, margin entire or occasionally some teeth on the apical half, with a sweet taste that may be faint in old leaves. It is conspicuous when in flower; flowers opening before new leaves develop, fragrant, in clusters from axils of previous year's leaves or from just above the leaf scars if the leaves have fallen; the petals are creamy yellow to yellow, with one pistil. Fruits nearly cylindrical to ellipsoid drupes 8–12 mm long, with thin pulp and a hard stone containing 1 seed; the tip usually retaining parts of the sepals. Foliage is relished by browsing wildlife. A yellow dye may be obtained from bark and leaves. It flowers Mar to May.

Distribution and habitat
Symplocos tinctoria is native to the southern and eastern United States, to an area from Oklahoma east to Florida and north to Virginia.
Occasional, plants are often scattered; uncommonly grouped; thin to dense woods of slopes, bluffs, broad-leaf woods of sandy soils, stream borders and stable dunes. It is the only representative of the genus in North America.

Ecology
The foliage is relished by browsing wildlife.

Uses
A yellow dye was once made from the bark and leaves. The bark was used as a tonic by early American settlers.

References

Gallery

External links
 http://www.carolinanature.com/trees/syti.html
 http://dendro.cnre.vt.edu/dendrology/syllabus/factsheet.cfm?ID=364
 http://www.rnr.lsu.edu/plantid/species/sweetleaf/sweetleaf.htm
 http://www.wildflower.org/plants/result.php?id_plant=SYTI
 http://www.pfaf.org/user/Plant.aspx?LatinName=Symplocos+tinctoria
 https://plants.ces.ncsu.edu/plants/all/symplocos-tinctoria/
 http://garden.org/plants/view/85584/Sweetleaf-Symplocos-tinctoria/

tinctoria
Plant dyes
Flora of Oklahoma
Trees of the Southeastern United States
Flora of Texas